Dany Verner (born April 28, 1977) is a Canadian former ice sledge hockey player. He won medals with Team Canada at the 1998 Winter Paralympics and the 2006 Winter Paralympics. He also competed in the 2002 Winter Paralympics.

References

Living people
1977 births
Paralympic sledge hockey players of Canada
Canadian sledge hockey players
Paralympic silver medalists for Canada
Paralympic gold medalists for Canada
Medalists at the 1998 Winter Paralympics
Medalists at the 2006 Winter Paralympics
Paralympic medalists in sledge hockey
Ice sledge hockey players at the 1998 Winter Paralympics
Ice sledge hockey players at the 2006 Winter Paralympics